The following lists events that happened during 1946 in the Union of Soviet Socialist Republics.

Incumbents
General Secretary of the Communist Party of the Soviet Union – Joseph Stalin
Chairman of the Presidium of the Supreme Soviet of the Soviet Union – Mikhail Kalinin (until 19 March), Nikolay Shvernik (starting 19 March)
Chairman of the Council of Ministers of the Soviet Union – Joseph Stalin

Events

Births

 22 February – Nagima Aitkhozhina, Kazakh biologist.

 23 March – Lyudmila Byakova, Russian seamstress.

See also
1946 in fine arts of the Soviet Union
List of Soviet films of 1946

References

 
1940s in the Soviet Union
Years in the Soviet Union
Soviet Union
Soviet Union
Soviet Union